Yambor is a rural locality (a selo) in Tabunsky Selsoviet, Tabunsky District, Altai Krai, Russia. The population was 2 as of 2013. There is 1 street.

Geography 
Yambor is located 12 km southeast of Tabuny (the district's administrative centre) by road. Tabuny and Sambor are the nearest rural localities.

References 

Rural localities in Tabunsky District